Tommy Hayes is a former Irish rugby union player. His preferred position was number 8.

When he first moved from Ireland to England, Hayes played at Plymouth Albion but then transferred to Exeter Chiefs where he remained for the rest of his career. He was their captain in May 2010 when they defeated Bristol in a 2 legged playoff, to win promotion to the Aviva Premiership. Hayes remained as captain the following season which was Exeter's first in the English professional top flight.

Exeter Chiefs announced Tommy's Retirement on 6 November 2013, citing a troublesome back injury as his reason for retiring.

He is the brother of record setting Irish Prop John Hayes. Following in the footsteps of his older brother John, Tom also played for County Limerick team Bruff R.F.C. as a youths player, winning an U18 AIL medal during the 1997 season which Bruff shared with Corinthians following a final which was tied after extra time.

References

External links
Munster Profile
Exeter Profile

1980 births
Living people
Rugby union players from County Limerick
Irish rugby union players
Shannon RFC players
Munster Rugby players
Plymouth Albion R.F.C. players
Exeter Chiefs players
Rugby union locks
Rugby union number eights